The Wreck of the Hesperus is a 1948 American adventure film directed by John Hoffman and starring Willard Parker, Edgar Buchanan and Patricia Barry.  It was produced by silent film actor Wallace MacDonald in association with Columbia Pictures, which also distributed the film. It is preserved in the Library of Congress collection.

Plot
Captain John McReady loses his ship in a storm when he is misled by a fake channel light. With no shipowner willing to give him another command, he accepts a job offered by George Lockhart, managing a salvaging warehouse. It turns out, however, that Lockhart is the man responsible for wrecking McReady's ship and others.

Cast
Willard Parker as John McReady
Edgar Buchanan as George Lockhart
Patricia Barry as Deborah Allen
Holmes Herbert as Pastor West
Wilton Graff as Caleb Cross
Boyd Davis as Governor Lincoln
Jeff Corey as Joshua Hill
Paul Campbell as Ned Jones
Paul E. Burns as Rudolph Zeiss

References

External links

1948 films
Columbia Pictures films
Films about seafaring accidents or incidents
Films based on works by Henry Wadsworth Longfellow
Films set in the 1830s
American black-and-white films
American adventure drama films
1940s adventure drama films
Films with screenplays by Aubrey Wisberg
Films directed by John Hoffman
1940s American films